On August 10, 2016, Anthony "Tony" Allen Timpa, an unarmed 32-year old man, was killed in Dallas, Texas by police officer Dustin Dillard. Officers had responded to a call by Timpa requesting aid for a mental breakdown due to the fact that he had not taken his prescription medication for schizophrenia and depression. Dillard pushed his body weight onto Timpa on the ground for around 14 minutes after he was already restrained, and officers ignored pleas from Timpa that he was in pain and was afraid he was going to die. Timpa's death was ruled a homicide due to "extreme physical exertion".

No criminal charges have been filed, but in 2021, a judge ruled that a wrongful death lawsuit filed by Timpa's family had merit and can go to trial.

Background
Timpa was a 32-year-old American trucking company executive from Rockwall, Texas. He had called 9-1-1 for aid, telling the dispatcher that he had schizophrenia and depression but had not taken his prescription medication.

Incident
Timpa had already been handcuffed by a security guard when a group of officers arrived. They restrained him on the ground while he squirmed, repeatedly crying out, "You're gonna kill me!" After he fell unconscious, the officers assumed he was asleep and, rather than confirm that he was breathing or feel for a pulse, joked about waking him up for school and making him breakfast. They kept him prone on grass for nearly 14 minutes and zip-tied his legs together, one pressing his knee into Timpa's back. One of the paramedics called to the scene administered the sedative Versed. The responders began to panic only as they loaded Timpa's body onto a gurney, one exclaiming, "He didn’t just die down there, did he?" Timpa died within 20 minutes of police officers' arrival, of "cocaine and the stress associated with physical restraint", according to his autopsy.

Legal proceedings
It took over three years for footage of the incident to be released. The footage contradicted claims by Dallas Police that Timpa was aggressive. The officers involved were Sgt. Kevin Mansell and Officers Danny Vasquez and Dustin Dillard. Criminal charges against three officers were dropped in March 2019 and they returned to active duty. An excessive force civil lawsuit against the officers was dismissed by U. S. District Judge David C. Godbey in July 2020 on the basis of qualified immunity. As of May 2021, this case is under appeal.

On December 15, 2021, the Fifth Circuit Court of Appeals issued a decision reversing the trial court decision giving the officers qualified immunity, which means the Timpa family have won the right to go to trial in their case against Dillard.

Reactions
Timpa's death came to prominence in 2020 after the murder of George Floyd, who died in a similar way. When Derek Chauvin was convicted of murdering Floyd, a number of commentators drew comparisons between Floyd and Timpa. Ryan Mills, writing in the National Review, claimed that, "There was no national uproar after Timpa's death. No national cries for justice and reform. The city of Dallas paid no settlement to Timpa's family." National Review said "there was more community pressure" in the Floyd case.

References

2016 in Texas
2019 controversies in the United States
Dallas Police Department
Timpa
Filmed killings by law enforcement